Andrew Martin Dober (born October 19, 1988) is an American mixed martial artist currently competing in the lightweight division of the Ultimate Fighting Championship. A professional competitor since 2009, he has also formerly competed for Bellator MMA, and Titan Fighting Championship. As of December 19, 2022, he is #14 in the UFC lightweight rankings.

Background
Born and raised in Omaha, Nebraska, Dober grew up with a single mother and a half-sibling, and didn't meet his father until 18. Dober began training in Muay Thai at the age of 14 and was highly successful, going on to become a two-time Amateur National Champion. He also wrestled his junior and senior years at Millard North High School. Dober is also a brown belt in Brazilian jiu-jitsu, having achieved that rank under Ed Shobe of Mid-America Martial Arts before he moved to train in Colorado.

Mixed martial arts career

Early career
Dober compiled an amateur record of 9–0 before turning professional in 2009.

Bellator
Dober faced Nick Nolte at Bellator 16 on April 29, 2010. He won the fight via arm-triangle choke submission in the first round.

Independent promotions
In the next three years, Dober would compile a 12–2 record in various promotions including Victory Fighting Championship and Titan Fighting Championship. He then appeared on The Ultimate Fighter.

The Ultimate Fighter
In February 2012, it was revealed that Dober would be a participant on The Ultimate Fighter 15. He was defeated in the entry round by Daron Cruickshank via unanimous decision.

Ultimate Fighting Championship
Dober stepped in for an injured Sérgio Moraes to face Sean Spencer at The Ultimate Fighter 18 Finale on November 30, 2013. He lost the fight via unanimous decision.

Dober next faced Nick Hein at UFC Fight Night: Muñoz vs. Mousasi on May 31, 2014. He lost the fight via unanimous decision.

Dober faced former WEC Lightweight Champion Jamie Varner at UFC on Fox: dos Santos vs. Miocic. He secured his biggest win to date, defeating Varner via rear-naked choke submission in the first round.

Dober faced Leandro Silva on March 21, 2015 at UFC Fight Night 62.  Dober lost the fight via technical submission in the second round. Silva was attempting to secure a guillotine choke after dropping to the mat with Dober's neck secured in his arm. Dober defended and moved his body to the side to stave off being caught in the choke.  Silva appeared to be losing his grip on the submission as Dober continued to work free. However, the referee stepped in and touched the fighters as if to motion that he was standing them up. In reality, he was stopping the fight due to submission despite the fact that Dober never tapped and was in no significant danger of being choked out from the hold. Despite the loss, UFC awarded Dober his win money with president Dana White stating that he would have liked to see the result overturned and the match declared a no contest. The fight was later overturned to a "No Contest" by the Brazilian MMA Athletic Commission (CABMMA) after the referee Eduardo Herdy admitted his mistake.

Dober then faced Efrain Escudero at UFC 188 on June 13, 2015.  He lost the fight by guillotine choke submission in the first round.

Dober was expected to face Erik Koch on January 2, 2016 at UFC 195. However, Koch pulled out of the bout in early December citing injury and was replaced by Scott Holtzman. He won the fight by unanimous decision.

Dober was expected to face Islam Makhachev on April 16, 2016 at UFC on Fox 19. After the weigh ins, the UFC announced that Makhachev had failed an out-of-competition drug screening, testing positive for the banned anti-ischemic meldonium. The match was cancelled.

A rescheduled bout with Erik Koch was expected to take place on September 10, 2016 at UFC 203. However on August 11, Koch pulled out again due to injury and was replaced by promotional newcomer Jason Gonzalez. He won the fight via TKO in the first round.

Dober next faced Olivier Aubin-Mercier on December 10, 2016 at UFC 206. He lost the fight via submission in the second round.

Dober then faced Josh Burkman on July 29, 2017 at UFC 214. He won by first round knockout.

Drew faced Frank Camacho in a welterweight bout on January 27, 2018 at UFC on Fox: Jacaré vs. Brunson 2. He won the fight via unanimous decision.
This fight earned him the Fight of the Night bonus.

Dober faced Jon Tuck in a lightweight bout on August 25, 2018 at UFC Fight Night 135. He won the fight by unanimous decision.

Dober faced Beneil Dariush on March 9, 2019 at UFC Fight Night 146. He lost the fight via submission in the second round.

Dober faced Polo Reyes on June 29, 2019 at UFC on ESPN 3. He won the fight via knockout in the first round.

Dober faced Nasrat Haqparast on January 18, 2020 at UFC 246. He won the fight via knockout in the first round. This win earned him a Performance of the Night award.

Dober was expected to face Carlos Diego Ferreira on May 2, 2020 at UFC Fight Night: Hermansson vs. Weidman. However, on April 9, Dana White, the president of UFC announced that this event was postponed to a future date. Dober instead faced Alexander Hernandez on May 13, 2020 at UFC Fight Night: Smith vs. Teixeira. He won the fight via technical knockout in round two. The bout with Ferreira was rescheduled for November 7, 2020 at UFC on ESPN: Santos vs. Teixeira. However, Ferreira pulled out on October 22 due to an illness and the bout was scrapped.

Dober faced Islam Makhachev March 6, 2021 at UFC 259. He lost the fight via submission in round three.

Dober faced Brad Riddell on June 12, 2021 at UFC 263. He lost the fight via unanimous decision. This fight earned him the Fight of the Night award.

Dober was next expected to face Ricky Glenn at UFC Fight Night 204 on March 12, 2022. However, a week before the event, Glenn withdrew due to a torn groin and was replaced by Terrance McKinney. After being knocked down twice within the opening minute, Dober rallied and won the fight via technical knockout in round one.

Dober faced Rafael Alves on July 30, 2022, at UFC 277. He won the fight in the third round after knocking out Alves with a punch to the body. The win also earned Dober his third Performance of the Night award. 

Dober faced Bobby Green on December 17, 2022, at UFC Fight Night 216. He won the fight via knockout in round two. This fight earned him the Fight of the Night award.

Dober is scheduled to face Matt Frevola on May 6, 2023, at UFC 288. at UFC 288.

Personal life
Drew was previously married to his former opponent Nick Hein's sister Gloria.

Dober is currently married to Hollis Casey Dober.

Championships and accomplishments

Mixed Martial Arts
Ultimate Fighting Championship
Fight of the Night (Three times) 
Performance of the Night (Three times) 
Tied (Dustin Poirier) for most knockouts in UFC Lightweight history (8)
Sherdog
2022 Round of the Year

Mixed martial arts record

|-
|Win
|align=center|26–11 (1)
|Bobby Green
|KO (punch)
|UFC Fight Night: Cannonier vs. Strickland
| 
|align=center|2
|align=center|2:45
|Las Vegas, Nevada, United States
|
|-
|Win
|align=center|25–11 (1)
|Rafael Alves
|KO  (punch to the body)
|UFC 277
|
|align=center|3
|align=center|1:30
|Dallas, Texas, United States
|
|-
|Win
|align=center|24–11 (1)
|Terrance McKinney
|TKO (knee and punches)
|UFC Fight Night: Santos vs. Ankalaev
|
|align=center|1
|align=center|3:17
|Las Vegas, Nevada, United States
|
|-
|Loss
|align=center|23–11 (1)
|Brad Riddell
|Decision (unanimous) 
|UFC 263 
|
|align=center|3
|align=center|5:00
|Glendale, Arizona, United States
|
|-
|Loss
|align=center|23–10 (1)
|Islam Makhachev
|Submission (arm-triangle choke)
|UFC 259
|
|align=center|3
|align=center|1:37
|Las Vegas, Nevada, United States
|
|-
|Win
|align=center|23–9 (1)
|Alexander Hernandez
|TKO (punches)
|UFC Fight Night: Smith vs. Teixeira
|
|align=center|2
|align=center|4:25
|Jacksonville, Florida, United States
|
|-
|Win
|align=center|22–9 (1)
|Nasrat Haqparast
|KO (punches)
|UFC 246 
|
|align=center|1
|align=center|1:10
|Las Vegas, Nevada, United States
| 
|-
|Win
|align=center|21–9 (1)
|Polo Reyes
|TKO (punches)
|UFC on ESPN: Ngannou vs. dos Santos 
|
|align=center|1
|align=center|1:07
|Minneapolis, Minnesota, United States
|
|-
|Loss
|align=center|20–9 (1)
|Beneil Dariush
|Submission (triangle armbar)
|UFC Fight Night: Lewis vs. dos Santos 
|
|align=center|2
|align=center|4:41
|Wichita, Kansas, United States
|
|-
|Win
|align=center|20–8 (1)
|Jon Tuck
|Decision (unanimous) 
|UFC Fight Night: Gaethje vs. Vick 
|
|align=center|3
|align=center|5:00
|Lincoln, Nebraska, United States
|
|-
|Win
|align=center|19–8 (1)
|Frank Camacho
|Decision (unanimous)
|UFC on Fox: Jacaré vs. Brunson 2 
|
|align=center|3
|align=center|5:00
|Charlotte, North Carolina, United States
||
|-
|Win
|align=center|18–8 (1)
|Josh Burkman
|KO (punch)
|UFC 214
|
|align=center|1
|align=center|3:04
|Anaheim, California, United States
|
|-
|Loss
|align=center|17–8 (1)
|Olivier Aubin-Mercier
|Submission (rear-naked choke)
|UFC 206
|
|align=center|2
|align=center|2:57
|Toronto, Ontario, Canada
|
|-
|Win
|align=center|17–7 (1)
|Jason Gonzalez
|KO (punches)
|UFC 203
|
|align=center|1
|align=center|1:45
|Cleveland, Ohio, United States
|
|-
|Win
|align=center|16–7 (1)
|Scott Holtzman
|Decision (unanimous)
|UFC 195 
|
|align=center|3
|align=center|5:00
|Las Vegas, Nevada, United States
|
|-
|Loss
|align=center|15–7 (1)
|Efrain Escudero
|Submission (standing guillotine choke)
|UFC 188
|
|align=center|1
|align=center|0:54
|Mexico City, Mexico
|
|-
|NC
|align=center|15–6 (1)
|Leandro Silva
|NC (overturned)
|UFC Fight Night: Maia vs. LaFlare
|
|align=center|2
|align=center|2:45
|Rio de Janeiro, Brazil
|
|-
|Win
|align=center|15–6
|Jamie Varner
|Submission (rear-naked choke)
|UFC on Fox: dos Santos vs. Miocic
|
|align=center|1
|align=center|1:52
|Phoenix, Arizona, United States
|
|-
|Loss
|align=center|14–6
|Nick Hein
|Decision (unanimous)
|UFC Fight Night: Muñoz vs. Mousasi
|
|align=center|3
|align=center|5:00
|Berlin, Germany
|
|-
|Loss
|align=center|14–5
|Sean Spencer
|Decision (unanimous)
|The Ultimate Fighter: Team Rousey vs. Team Tate Finale
|
|align=center|3
|align=center|5:00
|Las Vegas, Nevada, United States
|
|-
|Win
|align=center|14–4
|Tony Sims
|Decision (split)
|Fight To Win: Prize Fighting Championship 4
|
|align=center|3
|align=center|5:00
|Denver, Colorado, United States
|
|-
|Win
|align=center|13–4
|T.J. O'Brien
|Submission (rear-naked choke)
|Victory Fighting Championship 40
|
|align=center|2
|align=center|3:57
|Ralston, Nebraska, United States
|
|-
|Win
|align=center|12–4
|Aaron Derrow
|Decision (unanimous)
|Centurion Fights
|
|align=center|3
|align=center|5:00
|St. Joseph, Missouri, United States
|
|-
|Win
|align=center|11–4
|Sean Wilson
|Submission (rear-naked choke)
|Disorderly Conduct 15: Resolution
|
|align=center|1
|align=center|4:58
|Omaha, Nebraska, United States
|
|-
|Win
|align=center|10–4
|Roberto Rojas Jr.
|Submission (rear-naked choke)
|Victory Fighting Championship 38
|
|align=center|1
|align=center|3:29
|Ralston, Nebraska, United States
|
|-
|Loss
|align=center|9–4
|Will Brooks
|Decision (unanimous)
|Disorderly Conduct 10: The Yin and The Yang
|
|align=center|3
|align=center|5:00
|Omaha, Nebraska, United States
|
|-
|Win
|align=center|9–3
|Ted Worthington
|Submission (verbal)
|Victory Fighting Championship 37
|
|align=center|3
|align=center|1:36
|Council Bluffs, Iowa, United States
|
|-
|Win
|align=center|8–3
|Jordan Johnson
|TKO (punches)
|Disorderly Conduct 4: Turf War
|
|align=center|2
|align=center|0:30
|Omaha, Nebraska, United States
|
|-
|Win
|align=center|7–3
|Sam Jackson
|Decision (unanimous)
|Victory Fighting Championship 35
|
|align=center|3
|align=center|5:00
|Council Bluffs, Iowa, United States
|
|-
|Loss
|align=center|6–3
|Ramiro Hernandez
|KO (punches)
|Victory Fighting Championship 34
|
|align=center|1
|align=center|2:29
|Council Bluffs, Iowa, United States
|
|-
|Win
|align=center|6–2
|Bobby Cooper
|Decision (unanimous)
|Titan FC 16
|
|align=center|3
|align=center|5:00
|Kansas City, Kansas, United States
|
|-
|Win
|align=center|5–2
|Kody Frank
|TKO (punches)
|Victory Fighting Championship 33
|
|align=center|2
|align=center|3:44
|Council Bluffs, Iowa, United States
|
|-
|Win
|align=center|4–2
|Steve Simmons
|TKO (punches)
|Fight To Win: The Professionals
|
|align=center|3
|align=center|1:37
|Denver, Colorado, United States
|
|-
|Win
|align=center|3–2
|Jimmy Seipel
|TKO (punches and elbows)
|VFC 32: Dober vs. Seipel 2
|
|align=center|2
|align=center|3:16
|Council Bluffs, Iowa, United States
|
|-
|Win
|align=center|2–2
|Nick Nolte
|Submission (arm-triangle choke)
|Bellator 16
|
|align=center|1
|align=center|4:45
|Kansas City, Missouri, United States
|
|-
|Loss
|align=center|1–2
|Brandon Girtz
|Decision (unanimous)
|VFC 29: The Rising
|
|align=center|3
|align=center|5:00
|Council Bluffs, Iowa, United States
|
|-
|Loss
|align=center|1–1
|Chase Hackett
|Decision (unanimous)
|FTW: Featherweight Grand Prix Final Round
|
|align=center|3
|align=center|5:00
|Denver, Colorado, United States
|
|-
|Win
|align=center|1–0
|Frank Caraballo
|TKO (punches)
|VFC 28: Throwdown
|
|align=center|2
|align=center|3:58
|Council Bluffs, Iowa, United States
|
|-

See also
 List of current UFC fighters
 List of Bellator MMA alumni
 List of male mixed martial artists

References

External links
 
 

Living people
1988 births
American male mixed martial artists
Lightweight mixed martial artists
Mixed martial artists utilizing taekwondo
Mixed martial artists utilizing Muay Thai
Mixed martial artists utilizing Brazilian jiu-jitsu
Sportspeople from Omaha, Nebraska
Mixed martial artists from Nebraska
Ultimate Fighting Championship male fighters
American Muay Thai practitioners
American male taekwondo practitioners
American practitioners of Brazilian jiu-jitsu